Calinaga is the sole genus of the monotypic nymphalid butterfly subfamily Calinaginae. Its species occur in South Asia and Southeast Asia. The evolutionary history of Calinaga remains a mystery until today. Recent research indicated that the common ancestor of Calinaga first split in the Eocene in southern China. This was most likely due to a consequence of geological and environmental impacts of the collision of the Indian and Asian subcontinents.

Classification
Calinaga aborica Tytler, 1915 – Abor freak
Calinaga buddha Moore, 1857 – freak
Calinaga buphonas Oberthür, 1920
Calinaga cercyon de Nicéville
Calinaga davidis Oberthür
Calinaga funebris  Oberthür, 1919 
Calinaga funeralis Monastyrskii & Devyatkin, 2000
Calinaga genestieri Oberthür, 1922
Calinaga gautama Moore, 1896 – Sikkim freak
Calinaga lhatso Oberthür, 1893
Calinaga sudassana Melville, 1893

References

Igarashi, S. & H. Fukuda (2000). The Life Histories of Asian Butterflies vol. 2. Tokai University Press, Tokyo.
Calinaginae at Markku Savela's Lepidoptera and Some Other Life Forms

External links
Images representing Calinaga at Consortium for the Barcode of Life

 
Fauna of Pakistan
Butterflies of Asia
Taxa named by Frederic Moore
Nymphalidae genera